Justin Rasmussen (born December 15, 1998) is an American professional soccer player who plays as a left-back for Major League Soccer club Portland Timbers.

Youth and college
Rasmussen played high school soccer at Bishop Gorman High School, where he was named Nevada State Offensive MVP two years in a row and high school Offensive Player of the Year. In 2016, he was named second team All-Star, and as a senior was named to the Class 4A All-Southern Nevada team. Rasmussen also played club soccer with the Las Vegas Sports Academy.

In 2017, Rasmussen attended Grand Canyon University to play college soccer. In four seasons with the Antelopes, Rasmussen made 55 appearances, scoring 16 goals and tallying ten assists. In his senior year, Rasmussen recorded nine goals and six assists for a team-best 24 points, earning WAC Preseason Offensive Player of the Year and All-WAC First Team honors. As a senior, Rasmussen became the first NCAA All-American in program history after scoring five goals in 10 appearances, landing himself on the United Soccer Coaches All-Far West Region First Team and featured on the Hermann Trophy watch list.

While at college, Rasmussen was part of the setup for National Premier Soccer League side FC Arizona in 2018, and with USL Premier Development League side Orange County SC U-23 in 2019, and in 2021 he was with the Portland Timbers U23, in what was now named the USL League Two. However, he didn't make an appearance for any team.

Professional career 
On January 11, 2022, Rasmussen was selected 27th overall in the 2022 MLS SuperDraft by Portland Timbers. He signed with the club on February 17, 2022. He made his professional debut on March 13, 2022, starting in a 1–0 victory against Austin FC.

Career statistics

Club

References

External links
GCU Lopes Profile
Portland Timbers Website
 

1998 births
American soccer players
Association football defenders
FC Arizona players
Grand Canyon Antelopes men's soccer players
Living people
Major League Soccer players
MLS Next Pro players
Orange County SC U-23 players
People from Las Vegas
Portland Timbers draft picks
Portland Timbers players
Portland Timbers 2 players
Portland Timbers U23s players
Soccer players from Las Vegas